Justice Hall is the sixth book in the Mary Russell series by Laurie R. King. Justice Hall may also refer to:

Benjamin F. Hall (1814–1891), chief justice of the Colorado Territorial Supreme Court
Benoni Hall (1710–1779), associate justice of the Rhode Island Supreme Court
Dominic Augustin Hall (1765–1820), associate justice of the Louisiana Supreme Court
Frank P. Hall (1870–1926), associate justice of the Tennessee Supreme Court
Fred Hall (1916–1970), chief justice of the Kansas Supreme Court
Frederick B. Hall, associate justice of the Connecticut Supreme Court
Frederick Wilson Hall, associate justice of the New Jersey Supreme Court
Gordon R. Hall, chief justice of the Utah Supreme Court
Hiland Hall, associate justice of the Vermont Supreme Court
John Hall (judge), associate justice of the North Carolina Supreme Court
Jonathan C. Hall, associate justice of the Iowa Supreme Court
Lot Hall, associate justice of the Vermont Supreme Court
Pike Hall Jr. (1931–1999), associate justice of the Louisiana Supreme Court
Robert Howell Hall, associate justice of the Supreme Court of Georgia
Samuel A. Hall (died 1887), associate justice of the Supreme Court of Georgia
William Hall (Rhode Island), associate justice of the Rhode Island Supreme Court

See also
Judge Hall (disambiguation)
Hall of Justice (disambiguation)